Alexander Zverev defeated Dominic Thiem in the final, 6–4, 6–4 to win the men's singles tennis title at the 2018 Madrid Open. He did not lose a set the entire tournament.

Rafael Nadal was the defending champion, but lost to Thiem in the quarterfinals in a rematch of the previous year's final.

Despite his withdrawal from the clay court season, Roger Federer regained the ATP no. 1 singles ranking as Nadal failed to defend his title.

Seeds
The top eight seeds receive a bye into the second round.

Draw

Finals

Top half

Section 1

Section 2

Bottom half

Section 3

Section 4

Qualifying

Seeds

Qualifiers

Qualifying draw

First qualifier

Second qualifier

Third qualifier

Fourth qualifier

Fifth qualifier

Sixth qualifier

Seventh qualifier

References

External links
 Main Draw
 Qualifying Draw

Men's Singles